Fantastic art is a broad and loosely defined art genre. It is not restricted to a specific school of artists, geographical location or historical period.  It can be characterised by subject matter – which portrays non-realistic, mystical, mythical or folkloric subjects or events – and style, which is representational and naturalistic, rather than abstract – or in the case of magazine illustrations and similar, in the style of graphic novel art such as manga.

Fantasy has been an integral part of art since its beginnings, but has been particularly important in mannerism, magic realist painting, romantic art, symbolism, surrealism and lowbrow. In French, the genre is called le fantastique, in English it is sometimes referred to as visionary art, grotesque art or mannerist art. It has had a deep and circular interaction with fantasy literature.

The subject matter of fantastic art may resemble the product of hallucinations, and Fantastic artist Richard Dadd spent much of his life in mental institutions.  Salvador Dalí famously said: "the only difference between me and a madman is that I am not mad".  Some recent fantastic art draws on the artist's experience, or purported experience, of hallucinogenic drugs.

The term fantasy art is closely related, and is applied primarily to recent art (typically 20th century on wards) inspired by, or illustrating fantasy literature. 

Fantastic art has traditionally been largely confined to painting and illustration, but since the 1970s has increasingly been found also in photography. Fantastic art explores fantasy, imagination, the dream state, the grotesque, visions and the uncanny, as well as so-called "Goth" and "Dark" art.

Related genres

Genres which may also be considered as fantastic art include the Weltlandschaften or world landscapes of the Northern Renaissance, Symbolism of the Victorian era, Pre-Raphaelites, the Golden Age of Illustration, and Surrealism.  Works based on classical mythology, which have been a staple of European art from the Renaissance period, also arguably meet the definition of fantastic art, as art based on modern mythology such as J.R.R. Tolkien's Middle Earth mythos unquestionably does.  Religious art also depicts supernatural or miraculous subjects in a naturalistic way, but is not generally regarded as fantastic art.

Historic artists and fine artists 
Many artists have produced works which fit the definition of fantastic art.  Some, such as Nicholas Roerich, worked almost exclusively in the genre, others such as Hieronymus Bosch, who has been described as the first "fantastic" artist in the Western tradition,  produced works both with and without fantastic elements, and for artists such as Francisco de Goya, fantastic works were only a small part of their output.  Others again such as René Magritte are usually classed as Surrealists but use fantastic elements in their work. It is therefore impossible to give an exhaustive list of fantastic artists, but a selection of major and influential figures is listed below.

 16–18th centuries

 Giuseppe Arcimboldo
 William Blake
 Hieronymus Bosch
 Brueghel
 Monsù Desiderio
 Henry Fuseli
 Hans Baldung Grien
 Matthias Grünewald
 Giovanni Battista Piranesi

 19th century

 20th century

Twentieth century
The rise of fantasy and science fiction "pulp" magazines demanded artwork to illustrate stories and (via cover art) to promote sales.  This led to a movement of science fiction and fantasy artists prior to and during the Great Depression, as anthologised by Vincent Di Fate, himself a prolific SF and space artist.

In the United States in the 1930s, a group of Wisconsin artists inspired by the Surrealist movement of Europe created their own brand of fantastic art. They included Madison, Wisconsin-based artists Marshall Glasier, Dudley Huppler and John Wilde; Karl Priebe of Milwaukee and Gertrude Abercrombie of Chicago. Their art combined macabre humor, mystery and irony which was in direct and pointed contradiction to the American Regionalism then in vogue.

In postwar Chicago, the art movement Chicago Imagism produced many fantastic and grotesque paintings, which were little noted because they did not conform to New York abstract art fashions of the time.  Major imagists include Roger Brown, Gladys Nilsson, Jim Nutt, Ed Paschke, and Karl Wirsum.

After 1970, modern western fantasy is influenced by illustrations from Conan the Barbarian and The Lord of the Rings, as well as popular works of SF and fantasy like the role-playing game Advanced Dungeons & Dragons or the French Heavy Metal magazine.

Contemporary and mid-century artists

 Chris Van Allsburg
 Yoshitaka Amano
 Wayne Barlowe 
 Carlo Bocchio
 Chesley Bonestell
 Arik Brauer
 Gerald Brom
 Margaret Brundage
 Clyde Caldwell
 James C. Christensen
 Roger Dean
 Vincent Di Fate
 Philippe Druillet
 Bob Eggleton
 Larry Elmore
 Ed Emshwiller
 Virgil Finlay
 Frank Frazetta
 Brian Froud
 Wendy Froud
 Ernst Fuchs
 Donato Giancola
 H. R. Giger
 Juan Giménez
 Jean Giraud
 Peter Goodfellow
 Peter Gric
 Rebecca Guay
 James Gurney
 John Howe
 Judson Huss
 Peter Andrew Jones
 Oleg A. Korolev
 Mati Klarwein
 Vladimir Kush
 Alan Lee
 Rodney Matthews
 Ted Nasmith
 Odd Nerdrum
 Octavio Ocampo
 John Jude Palencar
 Keith Parkinson
 Richard M. Powers
 Patrick J. Jones
 Donald Pass
 Bruce Pennington
 Luis Royo
 Mark Ryden
 De Es Schwertberger
 Maurice Sendak
 Brian Selznick
 Luigi Serafini
 Wojciech Siudmak
 Jean Thomassen
 Boris Vallejo
 Robert Venosa
 Michael Whelan
 Bernie Wrightson
 Jacek Yerka

Non-European art
Non-European art may contain fantastic elements, although it is not necessarily easy to separate them from religious elements involving supernatural beings and miraculous events.

Sculptor Bunleua Sulilat is a notable contemporary Asian Fantastic artist.

See also 
 Dream art
 Outsider art
 Society for the Art of Imagination
 Surrealism
 Vienna School of Fantastic Realism
 Gruyères Castle

References

Bibliography 
 Coleman, A.D. (1977).  The Grotesque in Photography.  New York: Summit, Ridge Press.
 Watney, Simon (1977).  Fantastic Painters.  London: Thames & Hudson.
 Colombo, Attilio (1979).  Fantastic Photographs.  London: Gordon Fraser.
 Johnson, Diana L. (1979).  Fantastic illustration and design in Britain, 1850–1930.  Rhode Island School of Design.
 Krichbaum, Jorg & Zondergeld. R.A. (Eds.) (1985).  Dictionary of Fantastic Art.  Barron's Educational Series.
 Menton, Seymour (1983).  Magic Realism Rediscovered 1918–1981.  Philadelphia, The Art Alliance Press.
 Day, Holliday T. & Sturges, Hollister (1989).  Art of the Fantastic: Latin America, 1920–1987.  Indianapolis: Indianapolis Museum of Art.
 Clair, Jean (1995).  Lost Paradise: Symbolist Europe.  Montreal: Montreal Museum of Fine Arts.
 Palumbo, Donald (Ed.) (1986).  Eros in the Mind's Eye: Sexuality and the Fantastic in Art and Film (Contributions to the Study of Science Fiction and Fantasy).  Greenwood Press.
 Stathatos, John (2001).  A Vindication of Tlon: Photography and the Fantastic.  Greece: Thessaloniki Museum of Photography
 Schurian, Prof. Dr. Walter (2005). Fantastic Art. Taschen.  (English edition)
 BeinArt collective (2007). Metamorphosis.  beinArt. 
 "El Canto de Abraxas" (2016) de Álvaro Robles G. (Editorial Salón Arcano) 

 
Visual arts genres